The common bream, freshwater bream, bream, bronze bream,  carp bream or sweaty bream (Abramis brama), is a European species of freshwater fish in the family Cyprinidae. It is now considered to be the only species in the genus Abramis.

Range and habitat
The common bream's home range is Europe north of the Alps and Pyrenees, as well as the Balkans. They are found as far east as the Caspian Sea, the Black Sea, and the Aral Sea. The common bream lives in ponds, lakes, canals, and slow-flowing rivers.

Description
Its maximum length is 90 cm (35.5 in),the recorded weight is around 9.1 kg (20 lb).

The common bream has a laterally flattened and high-backed body and a slightly undershot mouth. It is a silvery grey colour, though older fish can be bronze-coloured, especially in clear waters. The fins are greyish to black, but never reddish.

Similar-looking fish

The common bream can easily be confused with the silver or white bream (Blicca bjoerkna), in particular at the younger stages (see picture). The most reliable method of distinguishing these species is by counting the scales in a straight line downwards from the first ray of the dorsal fin to the lateral line. Silver bream have fewer than 10 rows of scales, while common bream have 11 or more. At the adult stage the reddish tint of the pectoral fin of the silver bream is diagnostic. Like other Cyprinidae, common bream can easily hybridise with other species, and hybrids with roach (Rutilus rutilus) can be very difficult to distinguish from pure-bred bream.

Habitat

The common bream generally lives in rivers (especially in the lower reaches) and in nutrient-rich lakes and ponds with muddy bottoms and plenty of algae. It can also be found in brackish sea waters.

Feeding habits
The common bream lives in schools near the bottom. At night common bream can feed close to the shore and in clear waters with sandy bottoms feeding pits can be seen during daytime. The fish's protractile mouth helps it dig for chironomid larvae, Tubifex worms, bivalves, and gastropods. The bream eats water plants and plankton, as well.

In very turbid waters, common bream can occur in large numbers, which may result in a shortage of bottom-living prey such as chironomids. The bream are then forced to live by filter feeding with their gill rakers, Daphnia water fleas being the main prey. If a common bream is malnourished, it can develop a so-called "knife back", a sharp edge along its back.

Spawning

At this time, the males form territories within which the females lay 100,000 to 300,000 eggs on water plants. The fry hatch after three to 12 days and attach themselves to water plants with special adhesive glands, until their yolk is used up.

Because of their slender shape, the young fish are often not recognised as bream, but they can be identified by their flat bodies and silvery colour. At this stage, the fish are still pelagic, but after a few months, they acquire their typical body shape and become bottom-dwellers. By three to four years old, the fish are sexually mature.

Fishing

The freshwater bream is not generally caught for consumption. Common Bream are popular with sport and match fishermen. However, bream are not as hard fighting as most other fish native to the UK, as due to their flat, disc-shaped profile they are relatively easy to bring to the bank.
Bream will eat most baits, especially:
 Sweetcorn - two or three grains hooked or hair-rigged.
 Maggots/worms - two or three straight on the hook.
 Boilies - the large mouths of Bream will devour most boilies

Bream can be caught in rivers or lakes, with generous use of groundbait to attract the shoals. They are not shy fish. Float fishing on the bottom is another technique used. Ledgering (using just a lead weight to hold the bait down) with a cage feeder full of bait, often works better on larger rivers and lakes.

See also
 Bream (disambiguation)

References

External links
      
 
ITIS 163666

Abramis
Freshwater fish of Europe
Fish of Europe
Fish of the Caspian Sea
Fish described in 1758
Taxa named by Carl Linnaeus
Abramis